Ais kacang, literally meaning "bean ice", also commonly known as ABC (acronym for air batu campur, meaning "mixed ice"), is a Malaysian dessert which is common in Malaysia, Singapore (where it is called ice kachang) and Brunei.

Traditionally, an ice shaving machine is used to churn out the shaved ice used in the dessert, originally hand cranked but now more often motorised. Many Southeast Asian coffee shops, hawker centres and food courts sell this dessert. Ais kacang is considered one of Malaysia's most unique dishes and is featured in many articles as such.

History
Early versions of ice kachang was first known to have been prepared since 1900s in Singapore, after the First World War, where costs for ice manufacturing was becoming more affordable. A earlier variant of the Singaporean dish was described as green, made from shaved ice, paired with syrups, soaked seeds and seaweed jelly and was sold mainly by street vendors. The dish underwent many different alterations and variants throughout the history of Singapore, where during the 1920s, one version of it was described as shaved ice topped with rose water, lime or liquorice. A version of the dish, known as Kachang mera, was also sold during the 1930s. By the 1940s, the version of the dish described as "shaved ice heaped into a little mountain", topped with red beans, "a Chinese grape-like fruit", syrup and condensed or evaporated milk, similar to how it is being prepared today. Some earlier variants of ice kachang are no longer sold, such as the ice ball version of the desert, which was popular during the 1950s till 1960s

Preparation 

Ais kacang was originally made of only shaved ice and red beans, though the number and diversity of ingredients has since expanded. Today, ais kacang generally comes in bright colors and with various fruit cocktails and dressings.

In Malaysia, variants now contain a large serving of attap chee (palm seed), red beans, sweet corn, grass jelly, roasted peanuts and cubes of agar agar as common ingredients. Other less common ingredients include aloe vera, cendol, nata de coco and ice cream. A final topping of evaporated milk, condensed milk or coconut milk is drizzled over the mountain of ice along with red rose syrup and sarsi syrup. Some stalls have even introduced novelty toppings such as durian, and chocolate syrup. There are also versions that shun the multi-coloured syrup and are served instead with just a drizzling of palm sugar syrup.

In Singapore, traditional ice kachang is usually made from shaved ice, packed into a mountain-like shape and consists of red beans, creamed corn, attap chee, cendol, and grass jelly, similar to the Malaysian version, and drizzled with syrups made from gula melaka, red rose syrup and pandan syrup. The dish has evolved to include fruits such as durian, mango, toppings such as Milo, peanuts and sago pearls among others.

See also 
Shaved ice § Regions, for similar shaved ice variations around the world.
Kakigōri: Japanese shaved ice
Bingsu: Korean shaved ice
 Tshuah-ping: Taiwanese shaved ice
Halo-halo: Filipino shaved ice (derived from Japanese Kakigori)
Es campur and Es teler: Indonesian shaved ice
Namkhaeng sai and O-aew: Thai shaved ice
Grattachecca: Italian shaved ice popular in Rome.
Hawaiian shave ice: Hawaiian shaved ice
Piragua: Puerto Rican shaved ice

References

External links 
 Asiacuisine: Ice kacang

Bruneian cuisine
Malaysian cuisine
Singaporean cuisine
Ice-based desserts